Eva Trautmann (born 18 June 1982 in Darmstadt) is a modern pentathlete from Germany. She competed at the 2008 Summer Olympics in Beijing, and qualified for the women's event, where she finished in twenty-ninth place, with a score of 5,028 points.

Trautmann also claimed the team silver medal at the 2007 World Modern Pentathlon Championships in Berlin, along with her compatriots Lena Schöneborn, who won gold in Beijing by the following year, and Claudia Knack.

References

External links
 

German female modern pentathletes
1982 births
Living people
Olympic modern pentathletes of Germany
Modern pentathletes at the 2008 Summer Olympics
Sportspeople from Darmstadt
World Modern Pentathlon Championships medalists
21st-century German women